Oncideres quercus is a species of beetle in the family Cerambycidae. It was described by Skinner in 1905. It is known from Mexico and the United States.

References

quercus
Beetles described in 1905